Io sono Tempesta (I am Tempesta) is a 2018 Italian comedy-drama film directed by Daniele Luchetti, starring Marco Giallini and Elio Germano.

Plot
Numa Tempesta is a fascinating, charismatic, and yet ruthless businessman, who will stop at nothing to close his deals, even if it means bending the law. That's until the law catches him and accuses him of tax evasion: in order to avoid prison, Numa is sentenced to a year of community service in a homeless shelter. Once there, Numa cannot conduct any kind of business, but he must close the deal of the century or lose his whole fortune.

Cast
 Marco Giallini as Numa Tempesta
 Elio Germano as Bruno
 Eleonora Danco as Angela
 Marcello Fonte as Il Greco

Awards and nominations

Nastro d'Argento Awards (2018)
 Nomination for Nastro d'Argento for Best Actor in a Comedy to Marco Giallini

References

External links

2018 films
2018 comedy-drama films
Italian comedy-drama films
2010s Italian-language films
Films directed by Daniele Luchetti
Films set in the 2000s
Films set in Rome